Ochlerotatus sticticus (synonym Aedes sticticus) is an uncommon mosquito, although the species can be abundant along river floodlands. It has been known to be responsible for human bites. Like all mosquitoes, it is only the females that bite.

Distribution
Ochlerotatus sticticus has a very patchy but wide distribution in temperate parts of Europe, Asia and North America. It has an episodic and patchy distribution in Iowa and Wisconsin.

Life cycle
Not a huge amount is known of its life cycle. It is believed that they overwinter in the egg stage.

References

 BioLib ''Ochlerotatus sticticus
 Global Biodiversity Facility (GBIF) ''Ochlerotatus sticticus"
  Aedes sticticus Iowa-Mosquito.net Iowa State University
  Ochlerotatus sticticus Taxonconcept Knowledge Base University of Wisconsin

Ochlerotatus
Insects described in 1838